James Henry Linton, DD(9 February 1879 – 2 June 1958) was an eminent Anglican bishop in the 20th century.

Educated at Durham University, and ordained in 1904, he was Vice-Principal of the CMS Training College in Oyo and then the Principal of  Stuart Memorial College, Isfahan   until his appointment to the episcopate as Bishop in Persia in 1917. He served until 1935 when he became Rector of Handsworth, retiring in 1954 and an Assistant Bishop of Birmingham (1937–1958).

References

1879 births
1958 deaths
Alumni of St John's College, Durham
English Anglican missionaries
20th-century Anglican bishops in Asia
Holders of a Lambeth degree
Anglican missionaries in Iran
British expatriates in Iran
Anglican bishops of the Diocese of Iran